Taurus is a 2001 Russian biographical drama film directed by Alexander Sokurov, portraying Vladimir Lenin. It is the second film in a trilogy by director Aleksandr Sokurov that began with Moloch about Nazi Germany's Adolf Hitler and continued with The Sun about Japanese emperor Hirohito. It was entered into the 2001 Cannes Film Festival.

Plot
In the face of illness, the historical personality turns out to be simply a man powerless to change anything in the fate of a country that is not yet under his control, the fate of his doomed awkward family, or the fate of his decaying personality.

Cast
 Leonid Mozgovoy as Vladimir Lenin
 Mariya Kuznetsova as Krupskaya
 Sergei Razhuk as Joseph Stalin
 Natalya Nikulenko as Sister
 Lev Yeliseyev as Doctor
 Nikolai Ustinov as Pacoly

Awards
2001 Russian Guild of Film Critics Awards:
Best Film, Best Director (Alexander Sokurov), Best Female Actor (Mariya Kuznetsova), Best Male Actor (Leonid Mozgovoy), Best Screenplay (Yuri Arabov), Best Director of Photography (Alexander Sokurov, Aleksei Rodionov) and Best Art Direction (Natalia Kochergina)

Other awards and nominations include:
 Grand Prix and Award for Leonid Mozgovoy and Mariya Kuznetsova, "Window to Europe" Festival of Russian Cinema at Vyborg, Russia, 2001
 Russian State Prize to Aleksandr Sokurov and Y. Arabov, Russia, 2001
 Gold Griffon Award, Festival of Festivals, St. Petersburg, Russia, 2001
 Best Director, Aleksandr Sokurov, and Press Award for the film, at Vivat, Russian Cinema FF, St. Petersburg, 2001
 Best Male Lead, Leonid Mozgovoy, Listapad IFF, Minsk, Belarus, 2001
 Special Mention, Mariya Kuznetsova, Sozvezdie (Constellation) IFF, Arkhangelsk, Russia, 2001
 Special Prize, Festival of Russian Film in Honfleur, France, 2001
 Best Fiction Film, Best Director, Best Male Lead, Best Female Lead, Best Script, Best Camera, Best Production Design, Nika Awards, Russia, 2002
 Best Film, Best Director, Best Camera, Best Actress, Best Actor, Best Script, Best Production Design, National Award Golden Ram, Russia, 2002
 Best Film, Best Actor, Best Script, Best Production Design, Bronze Horseman, the Professional Awards of the Lenfilm Studio, Russia, 2001

References

External links
 

2001 films
2001 drama films
2001 biographical drama films
Russian biographical drama films
Films directed by Alexander Sokurov
Lenfilm films
2000s Russian-language films
Films about Vladimir Lenin
Cultural depictions of Vladimir Lenin
Cultural depictions of Joseph Stalin